Peter Guthrie (born 10 October 1961 in Newcastle upon Tyne) is an English former professional footballer who played as a goalkeeper in the Football League for Swansea City and Bournemouth, and in the Hong Kong First Division League for Sing Tao, Hong Kong Rangers and Happy Valley.
He played on several occasions for a representative Hong Kong League XI, including in their 3–1 defeat of the Chile national team in the 1998 Carlsberg Cup.
He also played non-league football before, during and after his league career, for Whickham, Blyth Spartans – where he first became a goalkeeper, having previously played as a striker – Weymouth, Barnet, Whitley Bay and Bedlington Terriers.

References

External links
 1998 article about Guthrie from the Hong Kong Standard

1942 births
Living people
Footballers from Newcastle upon Tyne
English footballers
Association football goalkeepers
Whickham F.C. players
Blyth Spartans A.F.C. players
Weymouth F.C. players
Tottenham Hotspur F.C. players
Swansea City A.F.C. players
Barnet F.C. players
AFC Bournemouth players
Sing Tao SC players
Gateshead F.C. players
Whitley Bay F.C. players
Hong Kong Rangers FC players
Happy Valley AA players
Bedlington Terriers F.C. players
English Football League players
Hong Kong First Division League players
Expatriate footballers in Hong Kong
English expatriate sportspeople in Hong Kong
English expatriate footballers